Teddy Zachery Berwyn Pai Stanaway-Teao (born 3 August 1989 in Rotorua, New Zealand) is a professional rugby player (outside back) contracted by Oyonnax in northern France. Stanaway made his first class debut for the senior Auckland rugby team in 2009 against Counties Manukau in a pre-season game, and was part of the full squad for the 2009 Air New Zealand cup where he continued to play through to 2011. He went on to represent Bay of Plenty rugby union making his BOP Steamers debut in 2014. In 2015 Stanaway made the All Blacks 7's squad where he was involved in 3 HSBC world series campaigns and was named in the rugby 7's squad to represent New Zealand at the 2016 Rio Olympics. Stanaway went on to win Gold at the 2018 Commonwealth games before signing with French side USO Oyonnax.

A member of the Cook Islands U20 team for the 2008 IRB Junior World Championship. The following year selected for the New Zealand national under-20 rugby union team winners of the 2009 IRB Junior World Championship Tokyo, Japan.

Teddy founded Ora CBD alongside Liam Messam in 2020.

Teddy attended Papakura High School before transferring to Saint Kentigern College.

Of Māori descent, Stanaway affiliates to the Ngāti Tūwharetoa iwi.

References

External links
 All Blacks Index
 Auckland Rugby website
 
 
 

1989 births
New Zealand rugby union players
New Zealand sportspeople of Cook Island descent
Auckland rugby union players
Bay of Plenty rugby union players
Rugby union centres
Rugby union players from Auckland
People educated at Saint Kentigern College
Living people
New Zealand male rugby sevens players
Ngāti Tūwharetoa people